Hamburger SV had another mediocre season, finishing in the lower reaches of the mid-table of Bundesliga. Mid-season purchase Bernardo Romeo made his mark immediately at his new club, which somewhat compensated for Sergej Barbarez loss of form. At the end of the season, Hamburg was ten points from both European qualifying and relegation.

Players

First-team squad
Squad at end of season

Left club during season

Competitions

Bundesliga

League table

Matches 
 Energie Cottbus-Hamburg 1–0
 1–0 Vasile Miriuță 
 Hamburg-Stuttgart 2–0
 1–0 Jörg Albertz 
 2–0 Erik Meijer 
 1860 Munich-Hamburg 1–1
 0–1 Nico-Jan Hoogma 
 1–1 Paul Agostino 
 Hamburg-Kaiserslautern 2–3
 0–1 Lincoln 
 0–2 Lincoln 
 0–3 Jeff Strasser 
 1–3 Nico-Jan Hoogma 
 2–3 Erik Meijer 
 Köln-Hamburg 2–1
 0–1 Carsten Cullmann 
 1–1 Dirk Lottner 
 2–1 Dirk Lottner 
 Hamburg-Mönchengladbach 3–3
 1–0 Collin Benjamin 
 2–0 Jörg Albertz 
 2–1 Markus Münch 
 2–2 Peter van Houdt 
 2–3 Marcin Mięciel 
 3–3 Jörg Albertz 
 Hamburg-Werder Bremen 0–4
 0–1 Aílton 
 0–2 Marco Bode 
 0–3 Fabian Ernst 
 0–4 Paul Stalteri 
 Nürnberg-Hamburg 0–0
 Hamburg-Hertha BSC 4–0
 1–0 Sergej Barbarez 
 2–0 Marcel Ketelaer 
 3–0 Marcel Ketelaer 
 4–0 Collin Benjamin 
 Wolfsburg-Hamburg 0–1
 0–1 Nico-Jan Hoogma 
 Hamburg-Hansa Rostock 0–1
 0–1 Markus Beierle 
 Bayern Munich-Hamburg 3–0
 1–0 Paulo Sérgio 
 2–0 Claudio Pizarro 
 3–0 Claudio Pizarro 
 Hamburg-Schalke 04 0–0
 Bayer Leverkusen-Hamburg 4–1
 0–1 Jörg Albertz 
 1–1 Michael Ballack 
 2–1 Oliver Neuville 
 3–1 Oliver Neuville 
 4–1 Oliver Neuville 
 Hamburg-St. Pauli 4–3
 1–0 Erik Meijer 
 2–0 Milan Fukal 
 3–0 Collin Benjamin 
 3–1 Thomas Meggle 
 4–1 Sergej Barbarez 
 4–2 André Trulsen 
 4–3 André Trulsen 
 Borussia Dortmund-Hamburg 1–0
 1–0 Lars Ricken 
 Hamburg-Freiburg 1–1
 1–0 Roy Präger 
 1–1 Stefan Müller 
 Hamburg-Energie Cottbus 5–2
 0–1 Silvio Schroter 
 1–1 Roy Präger 
 2–1 Roy Präger 
 3–1 Milan Fukal 
 4–1 Mehdi Mahdavikia 
 5–1 Sergej Barbarez 
 5–2 Laurentiu Reghecampf 
 Stuttgart-Hamburg 3–0
 1–0 Ioan Ganea 
 2–0 Ingo Hertzsch 
 3–0 Marcelo Bordon 
 Hamburg-1860 Munich 2–1
 1–0 Roy Präger 
 2–0 Bernardo Romeo 
 2–1 Markus Weissenberger 
 Kaiserslautern-Hamburg 2–2
 1–0 Mario Basler 
 1–1 Bernardo Romeo 
 2–1 Miroslav Klose 
 2–2 Marek Heinz 
 Hamburg-Köln 4–0
 1–0 Milan Fukal 
 2–0 Moses Sichone 
 3–0 Sergej Barbarez 
 4–0 Bernardo Romeo 
 Mönchengladbach-Hamburg 2–1
 1–0 Peter van Houdt 
 1–1 Rodolfo Cardoso 
 2–1 Igor Demo 
 Werder Bremen-Hamburg 0–1
 0–1 Bernardo Romeo 
 Hamburg-Nürnberg 3–1
 1–0 Darius Kampa 
 2–0 Milan Fukal 
 2–1 Jacek Krzynówek 
 3–1 Roda Antar 
 Hertha BSC-Hamburg 6–0
 1–0 Michael Preetz 
 2–0 Bart Goor 
 3–0 Marcelinho 
 4–0 Bart Goor 
 5–0 Bart Goor 
 6–0 Bart Goor 
 Hamburg-Wolfsburg 1–1
 0–1 Diego Klimowicz 
 1–1 Sergej Barbarez 
 Hansa Rostock-Hamburg 1–1
 1–0 Andreas Jakobsson 
 1–1 Sergej Barbarez 
 Hamburg-Bayern Munich 0–0
 Schalke 04-Hamburg 2–0
 1–0 Émile Mpenza 
 2–0 Ebbe Sand 
 Hamburg-Bayer Leverkusen 1–1
 1–0 Sergej Barbarez 
 1–1 Oliver Neuville 
 St. Pauli-Hamburg 0–4
 0–1 Bernardo Romeo 
 0–2 Martin Groth 
 0–3 Nico-Jan Hoogma 
 0–4 Bernardo Romeo 
 Hamburg-Borussia Dortmund 3–4
 0–1 Márcio Amoroso 
 0–2 Tomáš Rosický 
 1–2 Raphaël Wicky 
 1–3 Márcio Amoroso 
 2–3 Nico-Jan Hoogma 
 2–4 Jan Koller 
 3–4 Erik Meijer 
 Freiburg-Hamburg 4–3
 0–1 Rodolfo Cardoso 
 1–1 Milan Fukal 
 2–1 Soumaila Coulibaly 
 2–2 Bernardo Romeo 
 2–3 Bernardo Romeo 
 3–3 Soumaila Coulibaly 
 4–3 Soumaila Coulibaly

Statistics

Topscorers
  Bernardo Romeo 8
  Sergej Barbarez 7
  Erik Meijer 4
  Jörg Albertz 4
  Nico-Jan Hoogma 4

Sources
  Hamburg – Soccerbase.com

References

Notes

Hamburger SV seasons
Hamburg